The Manor is a house in the village of Hemingford Grey, Cambridgeshire.  It was built in the 1130s and is one of the oldest continuously inhabited houses in Britain — often claimed as the oldest, although this is disputed.  Much of the original house remains intact despite various changes over nine centuries.

During the early 18th century, the manor was home to the "Beautiful Miss Gunnings", sisters Maria and Elizabeth Gunnings, who had a reputation of being among the most beautiful women in Europe. William Cowper, the poet, on observing them whilst walking his dog by the river described them as "two nymphs adorned with every grace". Maria later married the Earl of Coventry. Elizabeth was married twice, firstly to the Duke of Hamilton and secondly to the Duke of Argyll. She had two sons with each and became the mother of four Dukes.

The house was made famous by its long-term resident, Lucy M. Boston, who bought it in 1939 and rechristened it as Green Knowe and wrote several books set there.  Apart from the fictional St Christopher on the side of the house, almost everything in the books can be found at The Manor. During the Second World War, she gave gramophone recitals for nearby airmen. The house remains much as Boston left it on her death in 1990, and is open for visitors by appointment.

The gardens, which were laid out by Lucy Boston, are surrounded by a moat and have topiary, old roses, award-winning irises and herbaceous borders. They are promoted by the Campaign to Protect Rural England.

References

External links
The Manor website
Interview with Diana Boston: Part 1
Interview with Diana Boston: Part 2

1130s establishments in England
Country houses in Cambridgeshire
Buildings and structures in Huntingdonshire
Historic house museums in Cambridgeshire
Gardens in Cambridgeshire
Literary museums in England
Women's museums in the United Kingdom
Manor houses in England
Hemingford Grey